In North Macedonia the driving licence is a governmental right given to those who request a licence for any of the categories they desire. It is required for every type of motorised vehicle. The minimum age to obtain a driving licence is 18 years. Regardless of age, in the first two years after obtaining the licence the driver is called a beginner and has limited rights concerning driving speed and when they can drive without a co-driver in the front seat who doesn't have a drivers licence (until 23:00).

Beginning in 2007, the driving licence format was changed from a pink booklet to a credit-card sized card.

Obtaining a licence

The driving licence can be obtained after finishing a driving school and passing a two-stage test with a theory portion and an on-the-road driving portion.

See also
Vehicle registration plates of North Macedonia
Identity card of North Macedonia
Macedonian passport

Macedonia
Road transport in North Macedonia